Mogridge is a surname. Notable people with the name include:

George Mogridge (1889–1962), American baseball player
George Mogridge (Old Humphrey) (1787 –1854), British writer
Jack Mogridge (1903-1978), Australian rugby league player
Martin J. H. Mogridge, (1940–2000), British transport researcher
William Mogridge, coxswain of the Torbay Lifeboat Station in Devon, England

See also
Moggridge (surname)